Frandsen is a surname of Danish origin.  It may refer to: 

 Aage Frandsen (1890–1968) – Danish gymnast
 Anders Frandsen – Danish actor and musician
 Mikkel Frandsen (1892–1981) – American physical chemist
 John Frandsen (composer) – Danish composer and organist
 Jørgen Frandsen – Danish handball player
 Kevin Frandsen – American baseball player
 Per Frandsen – Danish soccer player
 Rasmus Frandsen (1886–1974) – Danish rower
 Scott Frandsen – Canadian rower
 Thomas Frandsen – Danish soccer player

Danish-language surnames